is a former Japanese football player.

Club statistics

References

External links

1982 births
Living people
Nippon Bunri University alumni
Association football people from Mie Prefecture
Japanese footballers
J2 League players
Japan Football League players
Roasso Kumamoto players
MIO Biwako Shiga players
Association football midfielders